Mbumba is a commune of the city of Tshikapa in the Democratic Republic of the Congo.

Communes of the Democratic Republic of the Congo
Tshikapa